Campus Martius may refer to:

 Campus Martius, the "Field of Mars" in ancient Rome
 Campus Martius (Ohio), an 18th-century fortification
 Campus Martius Museum, on the site of the Campus Martius fort in Ohio
 Campus Martius Park in Detroit, Michigan
 Campus Martius station, a QLine station serving the park
 Campus Martius, Latin name for the Marchfield (assembly)

See also
 Campo Marzio, a rione of Rome
Field of Mars (disambiguation)
Champ de Mars (disambiguation)
Campo Marte (disambiguation)